A Little Learning may refer to:

 A Little Learning (Super Mario World), an episode of Super Mario World
 A Little Learning (book), Evelyn Waugh's unfinished autobiography